Verkhny Torey (Deede Tori) is a rural locality (a selo) in Dzhidinsky District, Republic of Buryatia, Russia. The population was 581 as of 2010. There are 40 streets.

Geography 
Verkhny Torey is located 49 km northwest of Petropavlovka (the district's administrative centre) by road. Ulzar is the nearest rural locality.

References 

Rural localities in Dzhidinsky District